Carlos Tiburcio Bea (born April 18, 1934) is a Senior United States circuit judge of the United States Court of Appeals for the Ninth Circuit. He was appointed to that court by President George W. Bush in 2003 to replace Judge Charles Edward Wiggins.

Biography

Bea was born in San Sebastian, Spain and emigrated with his family in 1939 to Cuba. While present under a non-immigrant visa, he studied at Stanford University and received his Bachelor of Arts degree there in 1956. He joined Delta Tau Delta International Fraternity while at Stanford. In 1952, Bea represented Cuba as a member of the country's basketball team in the Helsinki Olympics. Upon his return, he was put into deportation proceedings for allegedly avoiding the draft. Bea suggested to the immigration judge that he be drafted to cure the apparent violation, but the judge refused as the Korean War had already ended. Bea won his appeal at the Board of Immigration Appeals, opining that the lower court had abused its discretion. After having his residency reinstated and accumulating the requisite physical presence, Bea petitioned for and became a naturalized citizen in 1959. He attended Stanford Law School and received his Juris Doctor in 1958. He was in private practice in California after that, but in 1990 he became a trial judge on the San Francisco County Superior Court. He served there until his appointment to the Ninth Circuit in 2003.

Federal judicial service

Bea had previously been nominated in 1991 to be a federal district judge for the United States District Court for the Northern District of California by President George H. W. Bush, but he never received a vote in the Senate.

Bush nominated Bea to the Ninth Circuit on April 11, 2003. The United States Senate confirmed him on September 29, 2003 by a 86–0 vote. Bea received his commission on October 1, 2003. In June 2019, Bea announced that he will assume senior status upon the nomination, confirmation and appointment of his successor. He assumed senior status on December 12, 2019.

Personal

His son is Olympic rower Sebastian Bea.

See also
List of Hispanic/Latino American jurists

References

External links

U.S. Department of Justice Profile
Press Release from the Ninth Circuit Announcing Bea's Investiture

1934 births
Living people
21st-century American judges
American people of Basque descent
Basketball players at the 1952 Summer Olympics
Cuban emigrants to the United States
Hispanic and Latino American judges
Judges of the United States Court of Appeals for the Ninth Circuit
Naturalized citizens of the United States
Olympic basketball players of Cuba
People from San Sebastián
Spanish emigrants to Cuba
Stanford Law School alumni
Superior court judges in the United States
United States court of appeals judges appointed by George W. Bush
Stanford University alumni